Autrey is a commune in the Vosges department in Grand Est in northeastern France.

Geography 
The village lies in the north-western part of the commune, on the right bank of the Mortagne, which forms all of the commune's western and south-western borders.

Points of interest 
 Jardin botanique de Gondremer

See also 
 Communes of the Vosges department

References 

Communes of Vosges (department)